Lakemba is a suburb south west of Sydney, in the state of New South Wales, Australia. Lakemba is located 12 kilometres south west of the Sydney central business district, in the local government area of the City of Canterbury-Bankstown.

Geography
Lakemba is in the Cooks River watershed. This river is tidal up to the edge of Lakemba. A bike and walking trail takes walkers and cyclists all the way from nearby Belfield to the east along the Cooks River, to where it flows into Botany Bay. In the opposite direction the bike and walking trail goes north to Olympic Park and Homebush Bay on the Parramatta River.

Canterbury Road winds its way high along the ridge, which is the boundary of the watersheds of Cooks River and Wolli Creek to the south. The Lakemba railway station is on the Bankstown Line of the Sydney Trains network. It is near the shopping centre on Haldon Street.

History
The area was at an early time in its colonial history originally known as Potato Hill because potatoes were cropped there. Land grants by the new colonial government began in Lakemba about 1810. Samuel Hockley was granted , which he called Essex Hill Farm, after his home county in England. The suburb was known as Belmore South until 1910.

Benjamin Taylor had a 22 hectare property in the 1880s. He named his property "Lakeba" (pronounced Lakemba) after the Lakeba island in the Lau Islands group of Fiji, where his second wife's grandparents, Rev and Mrs Cross, were missionaries from 1835. One of the original streets is Oneata Street, named after another small Fijian Island, close to Lakeba. Benjamin Taylor was variously an entomologist, town clerk, Alderman and Mayor of Canterbury Council. The railway line was built to the neighbouring suburb of Belmore in 1895 and extended to Lakemba and beyond, in 1909. The station was built on Benjamin Taylor's property and was named after his ‘Lakemba Cottage’.

The first school opened here as Belmore School in April 1869 and became known as Belmore South in September 1907 until it was changed to Lakemba Public School in July 1969. The post office opened on 1 July 1920
.

Population

In the 2016 Census, there were 17,023 people in Lakemba.

Lakemba has had a diverse demographic history. Like most of the rest of Australia, its first non-Aboriginal inhabitants in the nineteenth century were British and Irish settlers. By the mid-twentieth century, the suburb had absorbed large numbers of Greek and Italian arrivals. Local businesses and clubs reflected this in Mediterranean delicatessens, take-away shops and the Greek Orthodox Club.

From the mid-1970s, Lakemba became very popular with migrants from Lebanon and by the mid-1990s the area was considered a centre of Lebanese Australian life. The founding of the Lakemba Mosque and the establishment of specialised restaurants, take-away shops, grocery shops, clothing and book sellers has encouraged a general perception of Lakemba as a predominantly Arab and Muslim suburb, particularly in the media. In recent times Lakemba has seen a large increase of people with Bangladeshi ancestry.

In 2016 31.5% of people were born in Australia. The most common countries of birth were Bangladesh 15.4%, Pakistan 6.6%, India 5.0%, Myanmar 4.7% and Lebanon 4.0%.

In terms of ancestry, the largest group in 2016 were those claiming Bangladeshi ancestry with 12.9%, followed by Lebanese 7.7%, Australian 6.7%, Indian 6.6% and Pakistani 6.0%.

14.7% of people only spoke English at home. Other languages spoken at home included Bengali 18.7%, Arabic 13.7%, Urdu 10.3%, Vietnamese 4.0% and Rohingya 3.9%.

In the 2011 census, the most common responses for religion were Islam 51.8% (8031), Catholic 13.4% (2072), Eastern Orthodox 6.2% (959), No Religion 5.3% (828) and Buddhism 4.3% (666). In 2016, the most common responses in Lakemba were Islam 59.2%, Catholic 10.3%, Not stated 8.5%, No Religion 6.5% and Eastern Orthodox 5.1%.

Transport

Lakemba railway station is located on the Bankstown Line of the Sydney Trains network. The line was opened in 1895 and electrified in 1926.

Construction of the new South West Metro rail link is to be completed by 2023 creating a train service every 4 minutes during peak hour with travel times between Lakemba and Central decreased from 28 minutes to 22 

For details of bus services see Lakemba station.

Residential area
Lakemba is mentioned heavily in news reports in regards to its affordability compared to the Sydney market being as close to the city as it is. The area was the best performing suburb over the last 10 years  with further growth expected with the construction of the South West Metro rail link which will reduce city travel times and bring new residential and commercial development to the area. Additionally Lakemba receives media coverage as one of the last areas of Sydney where it is cheaper to buy than rent

Commercial area
Lakemba has many shops, on and around Haldon Street, where a wide range of international and local foods can be purchased. There are also commercial developments along Canterbury Road. The Lakemba Palms shopping centre, is located on the corner of Haldon Street and Lakemba street. On 3 December 2007, a fire gutted the Lakemba Palms shopping centre and faced demolition.

Lakemba Ramadan Markets
Lakemba Ramadan Markets at Haldon St is a nightly food market in the month of Ramadan. According to visitors, the Camel burger is the best dish from the Ramadan night market in Lakemba. The popularity of the Ramadan markets and its offerings throughout the year eventually attract thousands of people every week.

Places of worship

Lakemba has many places of worship to cater for the different religions of its population, including St Therese Catholic Church, Lakemba Uniting Church, Lakemba Presbyterian Church and several Mosques including the Darul Ulum Sydney, Lakemba Mosque, Ernest Street Masjid, Lakemba Musalla, and Ahl Al Sunna Wal Jamaah Association Musallah, .

The St. Andrews Anglican Church, located at the corner of Quigg and Lakemba Street, was built in 1923 as a brick building with a significant collection of stained glass windows. The original church was a wooden building, later extended to become the parish hall.

Schools
Lakemba contains multiple private and public schools including:

 Lakemba Public School,  
 Hampden Park Public School,  
 Canterbury Vale School,  
 St Therese Primary School, 
 Holy Spirit College,   
 Rissalah College,   
 AlFaisal College,  
 AlHikma College,  .

Politics
Lakemba is the name of one of the parliamentary constituencies of New South Wales. The Electoral district of Lakemba is currently occupied by Jihad Dib, from the Australian Labor Party. The Federal Member of Parliament is Tony Burke.

Lakemba Fire Station

The fire station was built in 1921 by the Board of Fire Commissioners of New South Wales. It was originally staffed by a combination of permanent and volunteer members. The station was built for a total cost of $13,950.00. It is located at 208 Haldon Street.

References

External links

St Andrew's Anglican Church, Lakemba

Suburbs of Sydney
City of Canterbury-Bankstown
Muslim enclaves